Bǎi Wàn Fù Wēng may refer to:
Hong Kong version of "Millionaire"
Malaysian Mandarin version of "Millionaire"